Fangs of Justice is a 1926 American silent adventure film directed by Noel M. Smith and starring Johnnie Walker and June Marlowe.

Cast
 Johnnie Walker as Terry Randall 
 June Marlowe as Janet Morgan 
 Wheeler Oakman as Paul Orr 
 Frank Hagney as Walter Page 
 Freddie Burke Frederick as Sonny Morgan 
 Cecile Cameron as Trixie
 Silver Streak as Silver Streak (as Silver Streak-King of Dog Actors)

References

Bibliography
 Munden, Kenneth White. The American Film Institute Catalog of Motion Pictures Produced in the United States, Part 1. University of California Press, 1997.

External links

1926 films
1926 adventure films
American adventure films
Films directed by Noel M. Smith
American silent feature films
American black-and-white films
1920s English-language films
1920s American films
Silent adventure films